Belvédère-Campomoro (or ) is a commune in the French department of Corse-du-Sud on the island of Corsica.

Population

See also
Torra di Campomoru
Communes of the Corse-du-Sud department

References

Communes of Corse-du-Sud
Corse-du-Sud communes articles needing translation from French Wikipedia